China Spring is a census-designated place in northwestern McLennan County, Texas, United States. It lies approximately twelve miles northwest of Waco, on Farm-to-Market Road 1637, and is part of the Waco Metropolitan Statistical Area.

Settlement of the area began as early as 1860, and the community was founded in 1867. It was named for a spring in a chinaberry grove. A post office was established there in May 1873 with Charles S. Eichelberger as postmaster. By the early 1880s, the community had 200 residents with five steam cotton gins and gristmills, three general stores and a Methodist church. Cotton, corn, and wool were the principal products of the area.  Early families in the area included the Worthams, Congers, Garretts, Higginbothams, Talberts, and Eichelbergers.

China Spring became the focus of a rural school district in the late 1920s. Two churches, a school, and many houses marked the community on topographic maps of the mid-1970s. The population for the year 2000 was reported at 4,087. By 2010, the population was estimated at 5,151. In 2005, the estimated median household income was $53,900 and the estimated median house/condo was $119,100.

Musician Ted Nugent owns a ranch in the area.

School
China Spring Independent School District serves area students.

External links

Unincorporated communities in Texas
Unincorporated communities in McLennan County, Texas
Census-designated places in Texas
Census-designated places in McLennan County, Texas
Populated places established in 1867